Fraterville, Tennessee is an unincorporated community located on State Route 116 in Anderson County, Tennessee, between the towns of Rocky Top and Briceville. It is included in the Knoxville, Tennessee Metropolitan Statistical Area.

Fraterville, which has a history of coal mining, is known for the Fraterville Mine Disaster that occurred there in 1902.

The name of the community, which is derived from the Latin word frater, means "village of brothers."

References

Unincorporated communities in Anderson County, Tennessee
Unincorporated communities in Tennessee
Knoxville metropolitan area
Coal towns in Tennessee